In the Byzantine Empire, the term "barbarians" was used for several non-Greek people. The Byzantines regarded most neighbouring people as barbarians. The Bureau of Barbarians was a department of government dealing with matters relating to these "barbarians". In the Early Middle Ages in Europe, the term was applied to Huns, Goths, Pechenegs, Avars, Slavs, Bulgars, and others.

References

Sources
 
 
 
 

Society of the Byzantine Empire
Barbarians